The name Roberge is an Old French reference to the longships (Viking ships) the Norsemen used, and the name is associated with seafarers and travelers. The name originated in the Normandy region of France, but is more common today in Quebec, Canada.

People with the surname Roberge 
 Bert Roberge (born 1954), former Major League Baseball pitcher
 Catherine Roberge (born 1982), Canadian judoka
 Dick Roberge (born 1934), retired Canadian professional ice hockey forward and coach
 Eusèbe Roberge (1874–1957), Canadian politician
 Fernand Roberge (born 1935), Canadian engineer, teacher and researcher
 François Roberge (born 1968), Canadian curler
 François-Olivier Roberge (born 1985), Canadian speed-skater
 Gabriel Roberge (1918-2006), Canadian lawyer and politician
 Giana Roberge (born 1970), American female road cycle racer and team director
 Guy Roberge (1915–1991), Canadian journalist, lawyer, politician, civil servant and the first Commissioner of the National Film Board of Canada
 Jean-François Morin-Roberge (born 1984), former offensive lineman in the Canadian Football League
 Jean-François Roberge, Canadian politician, Quebec's Minister of Education
 Kalyna Roberge (born 1986), Canadian short track speed skater
 Louis-Édouard Roberge (1896–1982), Canadian merchant and politician
 Mario Roberge (born 1964), retired Canadian ice hockey forward
 Rob Roberge, American writer, guitarist, singer, and academic
 Skippy Roberge (1917–1993), American professional baseball player
 Sean Roberge (1972–1996), Canadian actor
 Serge Roberge (born 1965), professional ice hockey player
 Sheila Roberge, American politician
 Sophie Roberge (born 1973), Canadian former judoka
 Valentin Roberge (born 1987), French professional footballer

Lakes 
 Lake Roberge (Grandes-Piles), located in Middle-Mauricie, Quebec, Canada
 Lake Roberge (Lac-Masketsi), Lac-Masketsi (Unorganized territory), Mekinac Regional County Municipality, Quebec, Canada